Ewald Eberle (born 16 April 1933) is a Liechtensteiner retired alpine skier who competed in the 1956 Winter Olympics.

References

External links
 

1933 births
Living people
Liechtenstein male alpine skiers
Olympic alpine skiers of Liechtenstein
Alpine skiers at the 1956 Winter Olympics